Coimbatore–Nagercoil Express (Train Nos 22667/22668) is a daily superfast express train run by Indian Railways between Coimbatore city Junction and Nagercoil in Tamil Nadu. The train made its inaugural run on 1 February 2008.

Service and schedule

Route and stations
This train passes through 14 intermediate stations including Valiyur, Tirunelveli, Vanchi Maniyachi, Kovilpatti, Satur,  Virudunagar Jn, Madurai Jn, Dindigul Jn, Karur, Pugalur, Erode Jn & Tiruppur

Coach and rake
The Coimbatore–Nagercoil express has rake sharing arrangement with Nagercoil- Thiruvananthapuram passenger, which departs from NCJ daily at 06:30 hrs. The train is pulled by Arakkonam/Erode WAP4. The train has 10 sleeper, 2 unreserved coaches and 2 luggage break-cum van.

References

External links
 16609 Time Table & Live Train Status
 16610 Time Table & Live Train Status

Rail transport in Tamil Nadu
Express trains in India
Transport in Coimbatore
Transport in Nagercoil
Railway services introduced in 2008